Microtis pulchella, commonly known as the beautiful mignonette orchid or beautiful onion orchid, is a species of orchid endemic to the south-west of Western Australia. It has a single hollow, onion-like leaf and up to twenty five white, thinly textured flowers with a slight perfume. It only flowers after fire and only sometimes produces short, thread-like leaves in the absence of fire.

Description
There are two raised, dark green calli in the centre of the labellum. Flowering occurs from November to January but only after fire the previous summer.

Taxonomy and naming
Microtis pulchella was first formally described in 1810 by Robert Brown and the description was published in Prodromus Florae Novae Hollandiae et Insulae Van Diemen. The specific epithet (pulchella) is a Latin word meaning "beautiful", referring to the flowers of this orchid.

Distribution and habitat
The beautiful mignonette orchid grows in peaty swamps, often forming large colonies between Albany and Augusta.

Conservation
Microtis alba is classified as "Priority Four" by the Government of Western Australia Department of Parks and Wildlife, meaning that is rare or near threatened.

References

External links
 

pulchella
Endemic orchids of Australia
Orchids of Western Australia
Plants described in 1810